Koroinen (Finnish; Korois in Swedish) is a ward of Turku, Finland, also known as Ward 5. The ward is located to the northeast of the city centre and named after Koroinen, a district in the centre of the ward.

The ward has a population of 10,419 and an annual population increase of 1.42%. 14.76% of the ward's population are under 15 years old, while 6.25% are over 65. It is one of the most multicultural of the city's wards, and this is reflected in the linguistic makeup, which is 83.01% Finnish, 5.42% Swedish, and 11.57% other.

Districts
The ward consists of five districts. One of them is divided with another ward.

See also 
Districts of Turku
Wards of Turku

Notes

Wards of Turku